The Vingtaine du Nord (La Vîngtaine du Nord in Jèrriais) is one of the two vingtaines of the parish of St. Mary in Jersey in the Channel Islands.

Nord